Simon II Gurieli (also Svimon; , died 1792), of the western Georgian House of Gurieli, was Prince of Guria from 1788/89 to 1792.

Biography 
Simon Gurieli was the eldest son of Giorgi V Gurieli, Prince of Guria, who abdicated in Simon's favor due to his old age and political instability in the principality. Shortly after his accession to the princely throne, Simon repaired to the Ottoman provincial capital of Akhaltsikhe for negotiations with the local pasha Isaq in order to ease Turkish pressure on Guria. On his way back, Simon's entourage was ambushed by the Muslim Georgian clansmen of Adjara and the prince was taken captive by the Adjarian chieftain Selim Bey, who released Simon after the latter agreed to marry off his 5-year-old daughter Kesaria to Selim's son Abdi Bey. In a civil war in the neighboring Kingdom of Imereti, whose monarchs claimed suzerainty over Guria, Simon supported David II, but he then made common cause with the eventual winner Solomon II. In 1790, the king of Imereti as well as princes-regnant of Guria and Mingrelia signed a treaty of alliance with Erekle II, ruler of the eastern Georgian kingdom of Kartli-Kakheti, in which Erekle was recognized as chief and doyen of the Georgian potentates. When Simon died in 1792, his younger brother Vakhtang took advantage of Simon's heir Mamia being still underage and seized the government of Guria.

Family 
Simon was married to Princess Marine (died 4 March 1814), daughter of the influential Imeretian nobleman, Prince Kaikhosro Tsereteli. He had three daughters and one son:

 Princess Kesaria (1785–1861), married to the Muslim Georgian nobleman Abdi-Bey Khimshiashvili (died 1859), son of Selim-Bey;
 Princess Elisabed (also known as Lisa; born 1786), married to Prince Ivane Abashidze (died 1822);
 Prince Mamia V Gurieli (1789–1826), Prince-regnant of Guria;
 Princess N., married to Tariel Dadiani of Mingrelia.

References 

House of Gurieli
1792 deaths
18th-century people from Georgia (country)
Year of birth unknown